Team CC is a Chinese esports team for the video game Overwatch competing in Overwatch Contenders (OWC) and an academy team for the Shanghai Dragons of the Overwatch League (OWL). The franchise was initially two teams, VPGAME.ZZ and VPGAME.ONE, before they were acquired by Invictus Gaming and rebreanded to iG.Fire and iG.Ice, respectively. Subsequently, the two Invictus teams were acquired by NetEase CC, a live video streaming platform based in Guangzhou, China, and consolidated into the single team Team CC. The team plays in the China region of OWC. Since inception, Team CC has won one regional title and one interregional title.

Franchise history

2016: VPGAME 
The franchise began in 2016 when Chinese esports organization vpgame established two Overwatch esport teams: VPGAME.ZZ and VPGAME.ONE.

2016–2017: Invictus Gaming 
On July 9, 2016, Invictus Gaming (iG) announced the acquisition of VPGAME's esports teams, rebranding VPGAME.ZZ to iG.Fire and VPGAME.ONE to iG.Ice. Both teams competed in the Overwatch Premier series, a series of professional Overwatch tournaments in China. iG.Fire qualified for the 2016 APAC Premier. After defeating Team Skadi's Gift in the first round of the double-elimination group stages, the team dropped the next two matches to Lunatic-Hai and Rogue to be eliminated from the tournament. iG.Ice qualified for the 2017 Spring Overwatch Premier Series, where the team made it past the group stages, but fell to Lucky Future in the quarterfinals.

2017–present: Team CC 
On August 4, 2017, NetEase CC announced that they had acquired iG's Overwatch teams and consolidated both them into Team CC. Prior to the creation of Overwatch Contenders China, Team CC competed in the 2017 Summer Overwatch Premier Series. On January 10, 2018, the Shanghai Dragons revealed that Team CC would compete as their academy team for Overwatch Contenders China.

In their first season in Contenders China, Team CC posted a 3–2 record in the group stages and qualified for the playoffs. While the team was able to defeat Legend Young Beyond in the quarterfinals, they fell to LGD Gaming in the semifinals by a score of 1–3. In 2018 Season 2, CC was able to qualify for the playoffs again, but fell to The One Winner in the quarterfinals. In the final season of 2018, the team qualified for the playoffs for the third straight season and was able to defeat Big Time Regal Gaming in the quarterfinals, but they lost to Flag Gaming in the semifinals.

In 2019 Season 1, Team CC advanced past the group stages to the playoffs for the fourth consecutive season; however, the team fell in the quarterfinals to Hangzhou Spark's academy team Bilibili Gaming. The following season, Team CC finished first in their group and made it to the China regional finals, but they fell to the Chengdu Hunters' academy team LGE.Huya in the finals match. Following their finals loss, head coach Moon Byung-chul was promoted to the head coach of the Shanghai Dragons.

In 2020 Season 1, Team CC reached the playoffs after nearly doubling the point total of the next highest seed. The team lost to Flag Gaming in the upper bracket semifinals. The team ran through the lower bracket to reach the Grand Finals; Team CC won the Grand Finals by a score of 3–0 and claimed their first OWC title. In Season 2, Team CC reached the playoffs and finished as the runners-up. As a result of their performance in the 2020 season, the team qualified for The Gauntlet Asia, a tournament consisting of the top OWC teams from the Asia-Pacific regions. Team CC advanced past the group stages to the double-elimination knockout stage. In the knockouts, Team CC reached the Grand Finals, where they defeated Gen.G 4–1 and claimed their first interregional title.

Seasons overview

Current roster

OWL buyouts and promotions 
All Overwatch Contenders players are eligible to be promoted by their affiliated Overwatch League team or signed to any other Overwatch League during specified non-blackout periods.

2017
Support Chen "Fiveking" Zhaoyu was signed by Shanghai Dragons on October 31.

2018
Tank Ma "LateYoung" Tian-bin and support Kong "Kyo" Chun-ting were signed by new expansion franchise Chengdu Hunters on November 28.

2019
Tank Wei "jiqiren" Yansong was signed by Chengdu Hunters on January 16.

2020
Tank Lee "Fearless" Eui-seok was promoted to the Shanghai Dragons on January 19.
Tank Jia "LiGe" Chengjie was signed by the Hangzhou Spark on November 16.
Tank Qui "GA9A" Jiaxin and support Cao "Faraway1987" Jiale were signed by the Chengdu Hunters on November 27.

2021
Tank Ham "SOMEONE" Jeong-wan was signed by the Florida Mayhem on November 18.
Support Wu "Haoyoqian" Gengtuo was signed by the Hangzhou Spark on November 18.

OWL affiliates
Team CC
 Shanghai Dragons (2018–present)

References 

Overwatch League academy teams
Esports teams based in China
2016 establishments in China
Esports teams established in 2016
Shanghai Dragons